Roger Price is the name of:

 Roger Price (humorist) (1918–1990), American humorist and publisher
 Roger Price (television producer) (born 1941), English television producer
 Roger Price (Australian politician) (born 1945), Australian former politician
 Roger Price (British politician), member of the Parliament of England for Buckingham in the early 18th century
 Roger Price, American minister and rector of King's Chapel (1729-1746)